Francesc Gay Puig (born 1967), better known as Cesc Gay, is a Spanish film screenwriter and film director.

Biography 
Francesc Gay Puig was born in Barcelona in 1967.
His 2015 film Truman won Goya Awards for Best Picture, Best Director, Best Actor (Ricardo Darín), Best Supporting Actor (Javier Cámara) and Best Original Screenplay (Cesc Gay and Tomás Aragay).

Filmography

Film

Television

Theatre
"Los Vecinos de Arriba" (2015) (Author and director)

References

External links

1967 births
Living people
Spanish male screenwriters
Film directors from Catalonia
Writers from Catalonia
People from Barcelona
21st-century Spanish screenwriters